Pyroxamine (INN), also known as pyroxamine maleate (USAN) (developmental code names AHR-224, NSC-64540), is an antihistamine and anticholinergic related to diphenylpyraline.

See also
 Benzatropine
 2-Diphenylmethylpyrrolidine
 Difemetorex
 Diphenylprolinol
 Desoxypipradrol
 Pipradrol

References

H1 receptor antagonists
Pyrrolidines
Ethers
Stimulants